is the twenty-fourth single by Japanese artist Masaharu Fukuyama. It was released on 20 May 2009. This single was released in three different versions – Limited Towel version, Limited DVD version and Normal version.

Track listing

Limited Towel Edition
Keshin

Keshin (original karaoke)
 (original karaoke)
 (original karaoke)

Limited/Normal Edition CD
Keshin

Keshin (original karaoke)
 (original karaoke)
 (original karaoke)

Limited Edition
Keshin (Music Clip)

Oricon sales chart (Japan)

References

2009 singles
Masaharu Fukuyama songs
Oricon Weekly number-one singles
Japanese television drama theme songs
2009 songs
Universal Music Japan singles